The Plaxton President was a low floor double-decker bus body built at Northern Counties plant in Wigan, England and branded as a Plaxton product for its main production run. It was first unveiled in 1997 on the longitudinal Volvo B7L chassis and later built between 1998 and 2005 following a body redesign. When it became part of TransBus International, the body was sold under the TransBus name. The President was built on the Dennis/TransBus Trident, the DAF DB250 and the Volvo B7TL chassis.

Features
The body was designed to compete with the Alexander ALX400 body, and had rectangular front headlights below a large front windscreen. From the side, it can be easily recognised by the different depths of windows on the lower deck; however, this is less apparent with newer bonded-glazed models. Seating varied according to the chassis and specification. TfL models were typically built with 41 seats upstairs, and 23 downstairs, with a centre exit door. Early TfL versions also had the staircase moved to the centre of the bus, although this was later changed to the standard position of just behind the driver.

Operators

London
The Plaxton President on various chassis combinations proved very popular with some of London's bus operators. The first production examples of the body were first delivered to Arriva London on the DAF DB250 chassis in 1999. Arriva London would go on to purchase 91 Plaxton Presidents on the DAF chassis until 2005, acquiring a further ten from Capital Logistics.

Metroline operated the most Plaxton Presidents in London, ordering 305 examples on the Volvo B7TL chassis and 260 on the Dennis Trident 2 chassis from 1999 to 2005. London General and London Central, both part of the Go-Ahead Group, also amassed large quantities of Plaxton Presidents, purchasing a total of 419 on the Volvo B7TL chassis as well as an additional 50 Dennis Tridents.

Other major London operators include First London, London United and Blue Triangle.

Outside London
Lothian Buses were the largest operator of Presidents outside London, purchasing approximately 205 from 1999 to 2004. All but seven examples were built on the Dennis Tridents chassis; the remaining seven Presidents were purchased on the Volvo B7TL chassis. Some of these would later receive open top conversion for Lothian's sightseeing subsidiaries.

National Express West Midlands, formerly Travel West Midlands, were the second largest operator of Presidents outside London with 102 examples new between 1999 and 2000, all of which were built on the Volvo B7TL chassis. These underwent refurbishment in 2007–2008. Recent deliveries to National Express West Midlands have seen some of these Presidents move mainly to the associated Xplore Dundee fleet or sold on to other bus operators.

Go-Ahead Group companies outside London also bought Presidents in substantial numbers. Brighton & Hove took 36 Presidents on the Dennis Trident 2 chassis between 2001 and 2002. This was followed by Go North East who took 15 in 2001 on the Dennis Trident chassis. Southern Vectis purchased 7 Presidents on Volvo B7TL chassis in 2002, prior before to the company being taken over by Go-Ahead.

The Stagecoach Group ordered nearly 50 low-height Presidents on Dennis Trident 2 chassis between 2000 and 2003. Stagecoach Cambus took the first seven Presidents in 2000, with the company later ordering a majority of their Presidents in 2003. 30 of these were delivered to Stagecoach Manchester, while six were delivered to Stagecoach Oxfordshire in 'Brookes Bus' livery. Stagecoach opted in 2003 for Plaxton to body these Dennis Tridents in order to support their Wigan factory, which was suffering from a lack of orders.

East Yorkshire Motor Services were another large operator of Presidents, ordering 36 lowheight examples on Volvo B7TL chassis ordered from 2000 to 2003. 30 were delivered to the main East Yorkshire fleet while six were ordered for their Finglands subsidiary in Manchester, with two Presidents for each company being delivered for evaluation in 2000 before orders commenced. East Yorkshire later purchased 27 mid-life Presidents from Go-Ahead London in 2012, some of which was converted for open top operation and driver training.

Smaller orders include Arriva which purchased 20 between 2000 and 2001 on the Volvo B7TL chassis for its Arriva Yorkshire subsidiary, the Blazefield Group who took 19, 16 for Burnley & Pendle and three for Yorkshire Coastliner, as well as independent based operators such as Pete's Travel, Mayne Coaches, Blue Bus & Coach Services, Hedingham Omnibuses, North Birmingham Busways and Liverpool Motor Services.

Replacement
The Mayflower Group, the parent company of TransBus International, went into administration in March 2004. It was bought out in May 2004 by a consortium including Brian Souter, the owner of the Stagecoach Group and was renamed Alexander Dennis. A programme of restructuring began within Alexander Dennis which, at the time, saw the Plaxton coach division divested and the TransBus product range rationalised. In turn a decision was taken to close the former Northern Counties plant in Wigan and phase out the President in favour of the Falkirk-built ALX400. The final Presidents were built at the Wigan plant in January 2005 and both it and the ALX400 would be phased out in favour of the semi-integral Alexander Dennis Enviro400 which took over from end of 2005. The Enviro400 has elements of the ALX400 and President in its design.

See also
 List of buses

References

External links

President
President
Double-decker buses
Low-floor buses
Open-top buses
Vehicles introduced in 1998